Thomas Edward Hampson (1 July 1910 – 19 July 1990) was an Australian athlete who competed in the 1938 British Empire Games.

At the 1938 Empire Games he was a member of the Australian relay team which won the bronze medal in the 4×110 yards event. In the 100 yards competition he finished fifth and in the 220 yards contest he was eliminated in the semi-finals.

References

External links
Thomas 'Ted' Hampson at Australian Athletics Historical Results

1910 births
1990 deaths
Australian male sprinters
Athletes (track and field) at the 1938 British Empire Games
Commonwealth Games bronze medallists for Australia
Commonwealth Games medallists in athletics
Medallists at the 1938 British Empire Games